The Sendai Girls World Championship is a women's professional wrestling championship owned by the Sendai Girls' Pro Wrestling. The title, which is situated at the top of Sendai's championship hierarchy, was introduced on September 17, 2011, and the inaugural champion was crowned on October 11, 2015, when Meiko Satomura defeated Ayako Hamada.

Like most professional wrestling championships, the title is won as a result of a scripted match. There have been eleven reigns shared among seven different wrestlers. Asuka is the current champion in her first reign.

Reigns

Combined reigns 

References

External links 
Sendai Girls' Pro Wrestling official site, in Japanese

World professional wrestling championships
Women's professional wrestling championships